The Estonian University of Life Sciences (Estonian: Eesti Maaülikool, EMÜ) located in Tartu, Estonia, is the former Estonian Agricultural University, which was established in 1951 and renamed and restructured in November 2005.

Eesti Maaülikool is, by its own claim, the only university in Estonia whose priorities in academic and research activities provide the sustainable development of natural resources necessary for the existence of Man as well as the preservation of heritage and habitat. The EMÜ is a centre of research and development in such fields as agriculture, forestry, animal science, veterinary science, rural life and economy, food science and environmentally friendly technologies. The university is a member of the BOVA university network.

In 2009, there were 4704 students at EMÜ. There were 983 employees, among them 228 lecturers and 159 researchers and senior researchers.

University is ranked among top 100 universities in the world in the field of agriculture and forestry.

Institutes

Teaching and research is carried out in five institutes: 
Institute of Agricultural and Environmental Sciences
Institute of Veterinary Medicine and Animal Sciences
Institute of Forestry and Rural Engineering
Institute of Technology
Institute of Economics and Social Sciences.

History

The roots of EMÜ are in the agricultural and forestry education and research carried out at the University of Tartu. At the opening celebration of the university in 1632, Johan Skytte, the Swedish chancellor and practical founder of the university, said that  wished that "even the peasants of this country could get their share of the watering springs of educational wealth." This statement is taken to be the beginning of agricultural education in Estonia.

After the reopening of Tartu University in 1802, a Chair of Agriculture was founded under Prof. Johann Wilhelm Krause. Initially agronomy was taught in the Faculty of Philosophy, later in the Faculty of Physics and Mathematics. This school was well known in Europe and Russia. When Tartu opened as an Estonian university in 1919, a Faculty of Agriculture, consisting of the Departments of Agronomy and Forestry, was founded. Experimental stations and trial plots, where students could undertake research work, also belonged to the faculty. A Faculty of Veterinary Science was founded based on the older Tartu Veterinary Institute. These two faculties formed the core of an independent university in 1951, the Estonian Agricultural Academy.

The Estonian Agricultural Academy was directly subordinate to the Soviet Union Ministry of Agriculture and prepared specialists in different fields of agriculture from agronomists and animal breeders to experts in the electrification of large farms. Work continued in this way until the end of the 1980s.

After the regaining of Estonian independence in 1991, the academy was renamed Estonian Agricultural University, and the institution restructured, also according to the radical changes in Estonian agriculture and forestry (such as the abolishment of kolkhozes and sovkhozes). New specialities like Environmental Protection, Landscape Architecture, Production and Marketing of Agricultural Products, Landscape Protection and Preservation, Applied Hydrobiology, Environmental Economics and Natural Resources Management were adopted.

Up to the end of 2004, the university had six faculties (Agronomy, Agricultural Engineering, Economics & Social Sciences, Forestry, Rural Engineering, and Veterinary Sciences) and eight institutes (Estonian Agribiocentre, Estonian Plant Biotechnology Research Institute EVIKA, Forest Research Institute, Institute of Animal Science, Institute of Environmental Protection, Institute of Experimental Biology, Institute of Zoology and Botany and Polli Institute of Horticulture).

However, the EAU was always in a limbo, not least under the influence of Europeanization after Estonia joining the European Union in 2004. Thus, in the same year the change to Estonian University of Life Sciences and refocusing was carried out, aimed at guaranteeing the institution's survival in the coming times.

Rectors
Richard Antons (1951–1954)
Minna Klement (1954–1969)
Arnold Rüütel (1969–1977)
Nikolai Koslov (1977–1988)
Olev Saveli (1988–1993)
Mait Klaassen (1993–1998)
Henn Elmet (1998–2002)
Alar Karis (2003–2007)
Mait Klaassen (2008–2022)
Ülle Jaakma (2023–)

See also
 Maaülikool

References

Notes
History of Eesti Maaülikool

External links

Official website
Bova-University Network
Introduction video to Estonian University of Life Sciences YouTube, 2022

 
Agricultural universities and colleges
Universities and colleges in Estonia
Educational institutions established in 1951
1951 establishments in the Soviet Union
Forestry in Estonia
Universities and institutes established in the Soviet Union